This list of Ukrainian bandy champions shows the winners and the runners-up for each year of the Ukrainian national bandy championship for men and is organized by the Ukrainian Bandy and Rink bandy Federation.

The national men's Ukrainian bandy champions have been crowned annually since 2012. The first national bandy championship of the independent Ukraine took place on February 26, 2012 in Severodonetsk, in the Luhansk region. The tournament was held at the city's central stadium in one day, and 4 teams took part in it: HC "Severodonetsk", "Azot" (Severodonetsk), "Avangard" (Budy) and "Dnipro" (Dnipropetrovsk).

For the 2012 season, the championship was decided by round-robin results, but in 2013-2015 a play-off with a deciding final was played instead.

Competing teams have included Avangard Budy, Azot Severodonetsk, Dnipro Dnipropetrovsk, Dynamo Kharkiv, Zenit Dnipropetrovsk, and MBC Severodonetsk.

Winners over the years

Men's Finals

The national championships did not take place between 2018—2020.

Gallery

See also
 Ukrainian Bandy and Rink bandy Federation
 Ukraine national bandy team

References

Champions
National bandy champions
https://uk.wikipedia.org/wiki/Чемпіонат_України_з_хокею_з_м%27ячем
Bandy clubs in Ukraine